The 2021 WTA German Open (also known as the bett1open for sponsorship purposes) was a professional tennis tournament played on outdoor grass courts at the Rot-Weiss Tennis Club in Berlin, Germany from 14 June to 21 June 2021. It was the 94th edition of the event on the 2021 WTA Tour and was classified as a WTA 500 tournament.

The 2021 relaunch of the German Open marked the first time the WTA Tour returned to Berlin since 2008 after the Qatar Tennis Federation, owners of the original clay tournament usually held prior to the French Open, had sold the sanction back to the Tour. In 2019, the WTA and All England Lawn Tennis and Croquet Club (AELTC) announced that the WTA Premier (now WTA 500) sanction from the Birmingham Classic would be transferred to a new grass tournament planned to be organized in Berlin. Originally scheduled for a debut in 2020, the inaugural edition was postponed to 2021 due to the COVID-19 pandemic in Germany.

Liudmila Samsonova became the relaunched tournament's debut singles champion after entering the main draw as a qualifier and defeating Belinda Bencic in her maiden WTA Tour career final. The all-Belarusian doubles team of Victoria Azarenka and Aryna Sabalenka defeated Nicole Melichar and Demi Schuurs in the final to win the new event's first doubles tournament.

Champions

Singles

  Liudmila Samsonova def.  Belinda Bencic, 1–6, 6–1, 6–3

Doubles

  Victoria Azarenka /  Aryna Sabalenka def.  Nicole Melichar /  Demi Schuurs, 4–6, 7–5, [10–4]

Singles main-draw entrants

Seeds

 Rankings are as of May 31, 2021.

Other entrants
The following players received wildcards into the singles main draw:
  Anna Kalinskaya
  Andrea Petkovic

The following players received entry from the qualifying draw:
  Hailey Baptiste
  Misaki Doi
  Magdalena Fręch
  Asia Muhammad
  Jule Niemeier
  Liudmila Samsonova

Withdrawals
Before the tournament
  Ashleigh Barty → replaced by  Madison Keys
  Jennifer Brady → replaced by  Angelique Kerber
  Sofia Kenin → replaced by  Jessica Pegula
  Petra Kvitová → replaced by  Shelby Rogers
  Naomi Osaka → replaced by  Petra Martić
  Maria Sakkari → replaced by  Veronika Kudermetova
  Iga Świątek → replaced by  Ekaterina Alexandrova

Doubles main-draw entrants

Seeds

1 Rankings are as of 31 May 2021.

Other entrants
The following pairs received wildcards into the doubles main draw:
  Julia Middendorf /  Noma Noha Akugue
  Garbiñe Muguruza /  Andrea Petkovic

Withdrawals 
Before the tournament
  Veronika Kudermetova /  Elena Vesnina → replaced by  Veronika Kudermetova /  Markéta Vondroušová

References

External links
Official website
WTA website

Bett1open
Bett1open
Bett1open